Alexander Haim Gray (June 21, 1898 – April 10, 1986) was a Canadian ice hockey right winger who played 50 games for the New York Rangers and the Toronto Maple Leafs from 1927 to 1933. With the Rangers he won the Stanley Cup in 1928.

Early life
Although born in Glasgow, Scotland, United Kingdom, Gray grew up in Thunder Bay, Ontario. He played for five years with the Port Arthur Ports of the Thunder Bay Senior Hockey League (TBSHL). According to Legends of Hockey, "he topped the league in goal scoring three times and was its most penalized player twice."

Playing career
In 1928 Gray signed with the New York Rangers of the National Hockey League. Wearing jersey number 2, he played on a line with Paul Thompson and Murray Murdoch. He helped the Rangers win the Stanley Cup that spring.

After his rookie season in New York he was involved in a big trade with the Toronto Maple Leafs, He was traded along with Lorne Chabot for Melville "Butch" Keeling and John Ross Roach.

He played a total of 13 games for the Maple Leafs in the 1928–29 season (7 regular season games and 4 playoff games). After 1 season in Toronto he was sent to the minors where he spent the remainder of his career.

Career statistics

Regular season and playoffs

Awards and achievements
1928 Stanley Cup Championship (NYR)

See also
 List of National Hockey League players from the United Kingdom

References

External links
 

1898 births
1986 deaths
Ice hockey people from Ontario
British emigrants to Canada
Cleveland Indians (IHL) players
Eveleth Rangers players
New York Rangers players
Sportspeople from Glasgow
Sportspeople from Thunder Bay
Stanley Cup champions
Toronto Maple Leafs players
Toronto Ravinas players